Mavo is a Japanese dada art movement.

Mavo can also refer to:

 Mavó (born 1971), Mozambican footballer
The old name for Voorbereidend middelbaar beroepsonderwijs, a school track in the Netherlands

See also